The year 1561 in science and technology included a number of events, some of which are listed here.

Cartography and navigation
 Bartolomeu Velho produces a Carta General do Orbe for Sebastian of Portugal.
 Richard Eden translates Martín Cortés de Albacar's Arte de navigar as The Arte of Navigation which becomes the first manual of navigation in English.

Medicine and physiology
 Gabriele Falloppio publishes Observationes anatomicae in Venice, the only work of his printed during his lifetime.
 Ambroise Paré publishes Anatomie universelle du corps humain and La méthode curative des playes et fractures de la test humaine in Paris.
 Smallpox epidemic in Chile.

Births
 January 6 – Thomas Fincke, Danish mathematician (died 1656)
 January 22 – Francis Bacon, English philosopher of science (died 1626)
 March 29 – Sanctorius, Istrian physiologist (died 1636)
 August 4 – John Harington, English inventor (died 1612)
 August 24 – Bartholomaeus Pitiscus, German trigonometrist (died 1613)
 August 25 – Philippe van Lansberge, Flemish astronomer (died 1632)
 September 29 – Adriaan van Roomen, Flemish mathematician (died 1615)
 October 8 (bapt.) – Edward Wright, English mathematician (died 1615)

Deaths

References

 
16th century in science
1560s in science